Majblomman (English translation: mayflower) is a paper flower pin sold by schoolchildren in Sweden to raise funds for charity. The Mayflower fundraiser was started in Onsala by Beda Hallberg in 1907, and has taken place in April and May every year since.

The flower pin has four parts; two groups of five paper petals, often a small paper disc, and a metal pin, in a different colour combination each year.

History 
Hallberg was an active member of Gothenburg's charity movement, and had the idea of selling mayblomma pins, to raise funds for tuberculosis research.

Born in 1869 in Onsala, she was the youngest daughter of a captain and a farmer's daughter. Her father left the family in 1870 to emigrate to the US. She is thought to have married a tobacco dealer in 1888 and got involved with Gothenburg charity work in 1890.

After seeing her daughter with a Gustavus Adolphus Day paper badge, she founded a committee including Frigga Carlberg, a feminist social worker and writer, as well as the municipal physician K. J. Gezelius. Despite others doubting her idea, she ordered 100,000 blue-coloured paper flower pins and decided to sell them for 10 öre each, an affordable price for most.

Her campaign became a tremendous success. Around 139,000 Mayflowers were sold on the 1 May 1907 in Gothenburg – exceeding even Beda's expectations.

A local newspaper wrote the following:

Outside of Sweden 

Following the initial success in Sweden, similar mayflower fund raising took place in Finland (1908), Norway and Denmark (1909), The Netherlands and Belgium (1910), Russia, Germany, Austria, Switzerland, Italy and France (1911), Britain and Estonia (1912), Algeria (1913), Cuba (1916), The US (1922) and India (1932). However, as tuberculosis rates in Europe declined, most international charities eventually disbanded, and now only remain in Sweden, Finland, Norway, and Estonia (today with different missions).

See also 
 Remembrance poppy, used in fundraising for veterans

References 

Charities based in Sweden
Swedish culture
1907 introductions
1907 establishments in Sweden